Officers' Schafkopf, also called Open Schafkopf (Aufgelegter Schafkopf), Farmer's Schafkopf (Bauernschafkopf) or Two-Hand Schafkopf (Zweier Schafkopf or Schafkopf zu zweit), is a German point-trick, card game for two players which is based on the rules of Schafkopf. The game is a good way to learn the trumps and suits for normal Schafkopf and to understand what cards one is allowed to play.

Names 
The game goes under a variety of other names, including Two-Hand Wendish Schafkopf (Wendischer Schafkopf zu zweit), Farmers' Schafkopf (Bauernschafkopf), Robbers' Schafkopf (Räuber-Schafkopf), Officers' Regalia (Offiziersschmuck), Open Schafkopf (Aufgelegter or Aafglegta Schafkopf) or Ölkopf. It is similar in concept to Officers' Skat.

Overview 
Officers' Schafkopf tends to be preferred over Officers' Skat in areas where Schafkopf is more popular than Skat. Although there are similarities in concept, Officers' Schafkopf differs in the number of trumps, the bidding, the scoring and culturally in terms of the cards used and the region it is played in.

Cards 

Officers' Schafkopf is usually played with 32 Bavarian-pattern cards from a Schafkopf pack, the Sixes being removed. There are eight Wenzels or permanent trumps – the 4 Obers and the 4 Unters – in addition to the Hearts, which is the normal trump suit in Schafkopf. The Deuce is usually called the Sow in Bavaria, but is often referred to as the Ace; its card symbol is either A, D or blank.

Card values follow the normal Ace-Ten game system:

Rules 
The following rules are based on Merschbacher:

Playing 

Dealer deals a row of 4 cards, face down, to each player, then a row of 4 cards, face up, to forehand, (i.e. the non-dealer) Forehand now announces a game - which must be either a Suit Solo or Wenz. If he passes, the dealer announces a contract. Next the dealer deals 4 upcards to himself and may double the game value by saying e.g. Stoß or Spritze.

Merschenbacher then gives two options for further play. In the first, the remaining sixteen cards are dealt to form another row of four cards, face down, for each player, and the remaining cards face up again on top of them. So each player now has eight cards, face down, in two rows of four, and eight cards, face up, on top of them.

In the second option, the players are dealt eight cards each which they pick up as a hand. If an upcard is played from the table, the one below is turned.

Forehand leads to the first trick by playing one of his upcards. Players must follow suit if they can; otherwise they are free to trump or discard. As an upcard is played, the one beneath it is turned and becomes available. The winner of a trick leads to the next.

Contracts 
The Suit Solo contracts are as per Schafkopf: Acorn Solo, Leaf Solo, Heart Solo and Bell Solo. In a Wenz contract, only the Unters and announced trump suit are trumps; the Obers revert to their natural rank.

Scoring 
Merschbacher does not cover scoring in his rules. Danyliuk uses the following system: before the game, an agreed sum (e.g. 10pf) is paid by each player into the pot. At the end of the deal, card points are totted up. If the declarer (the one who announced a game)  scores 61 or more, he has won. His opponent only needs 60 to win. A simple win earns 1pf, a schneider (loser scores less than 30 points) earns double and a schwarz (loser scores no points) earns treble.

Variants 
Lembke describes Two-Hand Schafkopf with the same trumps as the normal game (Rufspiel or Sauspiel) in Schafkopf i.e. all Obers, Unters and Hearts, but also suggests variants with different trumps as follows:

 Unters and Bells (=Bell Wenz)
 Announced trumps - after the first 4 upcards are dealt to forehand, he announces the trump suit (=Suit Solo)
 Unters only (= Wenz)

A combination of 2 and 3 corresponds to the trump system used in Officers' Skat.

References

Literature 
 Danyliuk, Rita (2016). Das große Taschenbuch der Freizeitspiele. Orig: Humboldt, Munich, 1983. 
 Lembke, Robert (2017). "Schafkopf zu zweit" in Das große Haus- und Familienbuch der Spiele. Fischer, xxxx.
 Merschbacher, Adam (2009). Schafkopf: Das anspruchsvolle Kartenspiel, 2nd edn. PLIZ, Munich. 
Wiesegger, Joseph (2007-2012). Schafkopf: Ein Versuch, Wissen zu sammeln.

Schafkopf group
Two-player card games
Bavarian card games
German deck card games
Point-trick games